Douglas J. J. Peters (born December 28, 1963) is an American politician from Maryland and a member of the Democratic Party. He served in the Maryland State Senate representing the 23rd district in Prince George's County from January 10, 2007 to July 31, 2021. In June 2021, Peters announced he wouldn't seek re-election in 2022; in July 2021, he was appointed to the unpaid University System of Maryland's Board of Regents and announced he would resign from the senate.

Background
Peters earned a B.S. degree in Finance from the University of Maryland, College Park and an M.B.A. from the University of Baltimore. He became President and Chief Executive Officer of The Peters Group, and through his business became involved with the Prince George's County Chamber of Commerce, Prince George's County Board of Trade and the Greater Washington Board of Trade. Peters was also a Captain in the United States Army Reserve, and earned a Bronze Star Medal during Operation Desert Storm. In 1998, Peters successfully ran for a seat on the city council of Bowie, Maryland, and four years later won a seat on the Prince George's county council.

In the legislature
Peters was elected to the State Senate in 2006 and took office in 2007. He sat on the Budget and Tax Committee and co-chaired the Veteran's Caucus.

Other Committees and Subcommittees:

 Capital Budget Subcommittee (Member 2008–present, Vice-Chair 2011-present)
 Education, Business and Administration Subcommittee (2007)
 Health, Education and Human Resources Subcommittee (2008–10)
 Health and Human Services Subcommittee (2011-)
 Special Committee on Substance Abuse (2007–present)
 Joint Committee on Base Realignment and Closure (2008–present)
 Joint Committee on Federal Relations (2011–present)
 Joint Committee on Access to Mental Health (Member 2009–present; Chair 2011-present)
 Prince George's County Delegation (Vice-Chair 2008–09; Chair 2009–present)
 Maryland Doctor's Caucus (Member 2010–present)
 Southern Legislative Conference (fiscal affairs & government operations committee (Member 2008–present)

References

1963 births
21st-century American politicians
Living people
Democratic Party Maryland state senators
United States Army officers
University of Baltimore alumni
University of Maryland, College Park alumni